The Clemson Tigers football team of Clemson University has had 250 players drafted into the National Football League (NFL) since the league began holding drafts in 1936. Each NFL franchise seeks to add new players through the annual NFL Draft. The draft rules were last updated in 2009. The team with the worst record the previous year picks first, the next-worst team second, and so on. Teams that did not make the playoffs are ordered by their regular-season record, with any remaining ties broken by strength of schedule. Playoff participants are sequenced after non-playoff teams, based on their round of elimination (wild card, division, conference, and Super Bowl).

Before the merger agreements in 1966, the American Football League (AFL) operated in direct competition with the NFL and held a separate draft. This led to a massive bidding war over top prospects between the two leagues, along with the subsequent drafting of the same player in each draft. As part of the merger agreement on June 8, 1966, the two leagues held a multiple round "Common Draft". Once the AFL officially merged with the NFL in 1970, the "Common Draft" simply became the NFL Draft.

The 2021 NFL Draft was the only draft where a Tiger was drafted first overall with quarterback Trevor Lawrence. Thirty-six Tigers have been drafted in the first round of the NFL Draft, with the most recent being Trevor Lawrence and Travis Etienne in 2021. The single first round of the NFL Draft with the most Tigers selected was 2019 with three players; while 1979, 1982, 2015, 2017, 2020, and 2021 saw two players go in the first round. The most Tigers selected in a single NFL Draft is nine, in 1983 and 2016.

Of the Tigers selected in the NFL Draft, twenty-one have been selected to a Pro Bowl, and twenty-five share a combined thirty-one Super Bowl championship rings.

The Pittsburgh Steelers and New York Giants have drafted the most Tigers, each with seventeen. Clemson has had at least one player selected by 29 NFL franchises since 2003. The New England Patriots haven't drafted a Tiger since 1991, while the Baltimore Ravens and Carolina Panthers have never drafted a Tiger.

Key

Players selected

Notes

Notable undrafted players
Note: No drafts held before 1920

References
General

 
 
 

Specific

Clemson

Clemson Tigers NFL Draft